For the American lawyer and university administrator, see Nicholas S. Zeppos.

Nicholas Zeppos was a general in the Hellenic Army in the 1930s. By 1936, he was the commander of the Salonica military district. When tobacco workers went on strike to demand higher wages, Zeppos announced he would attack them with military force, including "tanks, airplaines and warships."

References

Year of birth missing
Year of death missing
Hellenic Army generals
20th-century Greek military personnel
History of Thessaloniki